Abyssosaurus is an extinct genus of cryptoclidid plesiosaur known from the Early Cretaceous of Chuvash Republic, western Russia. It possessed a shortened skull, and it has been suggested that it primarily inhabited the bathyal zone.

Discovery
Abyssosaurus is known only from the holotype specimen, Museum of Chuvash Natural Historical Society (MChEIO) no. PM/1, a partial postcranial skeleton. The holotype was collected in Poretskii District of Chuvashia, near Mishukovo, dating to the late Hauterivian faunal stage of the Early Cretaceous, about 133-130 million years ago. The specimen was initially thought to occupy an intermediate position between the Late Jurassic Tatenectes and Kimmerosaurus and the Late Cretaceous Aristonectes and Kaiwhekea. Berezin (2011) considered Abyssosaurus to represent the first reliable record of Aristonectidae in Russia. A large phylogenetic analysis performed by Roger Benson and Patrick Druckenmiller found it to be a derived cryptoclidid closely related to Colymbosaurus.

Description

In 2019, Alexander Yu Berezin described the overall anatomy of Abyssosaurus in great detail. The maxilla is noted to possess features similar to those present in immature elasmosaurids. The apex cutting edge deflects forwards at a 110° angle, and the rear part of the bone is undeveloped, protruding backwards in the form of a small spike. Berezin notes that the maxillary restructuring is associated with the overall structure of the skull. The eye sockets are large and rounded, more so than in most other cryptoclidids. The overall skull is extremely short and triangular.<ref name="berezin2019"/

Abyssosaurus's gastralia exhibit pachyostosis, apparently with the sole purpose of making the animal less buoyant. Indeed, O'Keefe et al noted that such a build would make a plesiosaur more resistant to turbulence, allowing it to maintain stability.<ref name="o'keefeetal2011"/ The flippers, too, display pachyostosis, and rear flippers of Abyssosaurus were longer than the front flippers. This is a trait also seen in other colymbosaurines. Based on this, Berezin suggests that Abyssosaurus and other colymbosaurines were efficient divers, able to hover in a diagonal position above the seabed while searching for food.

Taxonomy 
Initially, it was suggested that Abyssosaurus was intermediate between Tatenectes and Kimmerosaurus, two cryptoclidids, and Aristonectes and Kaiwhekea, two elasmosaurids. Later analysis suggests that it was a colymbosaurine cryptoclidid. Below is a phylogenetic tree of the Cryptoclididae, after Benson & Bowdler (2014):<ref name="benson&bowdler2014"/

Palaeobiology 
In an attempt to explain the peculiar anatomy of Abyssosaurus, Berezin noted that adaptation to cold, harsh, deep-sea conditions is accompanied by the loss of ontogenetic stages. Organisms not only retain the paedomorphic features of their young, but also exhibit behaviours similar to those of much younger animals—slow, relatively sedentary lifestyles. Such organisms typically spend a great deal of time growing up, and have a long life expectancy. The sperm whale's behaviour and morphology, for example, allow it to rest for a long time after a series of deep dives, sleeping vertically near the surface of the water. Abyssosaurus probably dwelled and fed primarily in the bathyal zone, occasionally rising up to the surface to take in a gulp of air. Indeed, the staple foods of the cryptoclidids, crustaceans and cephalopods, were present in this environment.

See also
 Timeline of plesiosaur research
 List of plesiosaur genera

References

Early Cretaceous plesiosaurs of Europe
Fossil taxa described in 2011
Cryptoclidids
Sauropterygian genera